Mariamne is a name frequently used in the Herodian royal house.  In Greek it is spelled Μαριάμη (Mariame) by Josephus; in some editions of his work the second m is doubled (Mariamme).  In later copies of those editions the spelling was dissimilated to its now most common form, Mariamne.  In Hebrew, Mariamne is known as מִרְיָם, (Miriam), as in the Biblical name (see Miriam, the sister of Moses and Aaron); Mariamne is the Hellenized version of the Hebrew, as Koine Greek was a common language in the late Hasmonean era in Judea (together with Aramaic), where both Mariamnes lived.

For Gnostic readers Mariamne is also recognized as possibly being Mary Magdalene. François Bovon, professor of the history of religion at Harvard University, has theorized based on his study of the Acts of Philip (which describes the apostle Philip as the brother of "Mariamne" or "Mariamme") that Mariamene, or Mariamne, was the actual name of Mary Magdalene. Mary/Mariam was a common name in 1st century Israel, however, not all Marys or Mariams would go by the name Mariamne.  Nicknames were often used to distinguish between those with common names (Mary, Joseph, etc.).  

Holders include:
Mariamne (second wife of Herod), a.k.a. Mariamne I
Mariamne (third wife of Herod), a.k.a. Mariamne II
Mariamne III, sister of Herodias
Mariamne (daughter of Herod Agrippa I), a daughter of Agrippa I.
Mariamne the sister of the Apostle Philip  
Olivia Mariamne Devenish (1771–1814), British socialite
Mariamne Johnes (1784-1811), daughter of Thomas Johnes, Hafod, Wales

See also
Voltaire's play Mariamne and Augustin Nadal's rival play Mariamne. A 1723 British play Mariamne by Elijah Fenton.
Miriai

Jews and Judaism in the Roman Empire
Hebrew feminine given names